Lee Ki-young (born August 26, 1963) is a South Korean actor. His notable roles include Marathon (2005), A Bittersweet Life (2005), and Love Me Not (2006).

Filmography

Film 

 Night in Paradise (2020)
 How to Steal a Dog (2014)
 The Plan (2014)
 Circle of Crime (2012)
 Once Upon a Time in Seoul  (2008)
 BA:BO (2008)
 Beautiful Sunday (2007)
 Soo (2007)
 Love Me Not (2006)
 My Captain Mr. Underground (2006)
 A Bittersweet Life (2005)
 Marathon (2005)
 Natural City (2003)
 Birth of a Man (2002)
 Marrying the Mafia (2002)
 The Beauty in Dream (2002)
 The Last Witness (2001)
 The Foul King (2000)
 Picture Diary (2000)
 The Soul Guardians (1998)
 Bedroom and Courtroom (1998)
 The Quiet Family (1998)
 Beat (1997)
 Mr. Condom (1997)
 The Gate of Destiny (1996)
 The Terrorist (1995)
 48 + 1 (1995)
 How to Top My Wife (1994)
 The Man Who Cannot Kiss (1994)
 The Fox with Nine Tails (1994)
 Two Cops (1993)
 I Will Survive (1993)
 Hong Do, a Kid Clown (1992)
 I Want to Live Just Until 20 Years Old (1992)
 Silver Stallion (1991)
 Fly High Run Far (1991)
 Teenage Love Song (1991)
 Who Saw the Dragon's Toenails? (1991)
 Mayumi (1990)
 Country of Fire (1989)
 Sand Castle (1989)
 The World of Women (1988)
 Prostitution (1988)
 Diary of King Yeonsan (1987)
 Lee Jang-ho's Baseball Team (1986)

Television series 

 Payback (2023) - Oh Chang-hyeon (Cameo)
 Big Mouth (2022)
 Extraordinary Attorney Woo (2022) - Cameo
 Business Proposal (cameo) (2022)
 Move to Heaven (2021)
 Vagabond (2019)
 Designated Survivor: 60 Days (2019)
 The Fiery Priest (cameo) (2019)
 Wok of Love (2018)
 Grand Prince (2018)
 While You Were Sleeping (2017)
 The King in Love (2017)
 The Emperor: Owner of the Mask (2017)
 Mrs. Cop (2015)
 The Man in the Mask (2015)
 Life Tracker Lee Jae-goo (2015)
 Punch (2014)
 The King's Face (2014)
 You're All Surrounded (2014)
 The King's Daughter, Soo Baek-hyang (2013)
 The Queen's Classroom (2013)
 A Tale of Two Sisters (2013)
 Incarnation of Money (2013)
 Golden Time (2012)
 Phantom (2012)
 History of a Salaryman (2012)
 Glory Jane (2011)
 Royal Family (2011)
 The Duo (2011)
 Ang Shim Jung (2010)
 Giant (2010)
 Obstetrics and Gynecology Doctors (2010)
 Dream (2009)
 Tazza (2008)
 Gourmet (2008)
 Tokyo Sun Shower (2008)
 New Heart (2007)
 Time Between Dog and Wolf (2007)
 Goong S (2007)
 Lovers (2006)
 Common Single (2006)
 One Fine Day (2006)
 Golden Apple (2005)
 Chosun Police (2005)
 5th Republic (2005)
 Super Rookie (2005)
 First Love of a Royal Prince (2004)
 MBC Best Theater "Hi, Clementine" (2004)
 Garden of Eve (2003)
 Drama City "Mousetrap" (2003)
 Thousand Years of Love (2003)
 Glass Slippers (2002)
 The Clinic for Married Couples: Love and War (1999)
 White Nights 3.98 (1998)
 Im Kkeok-jeong (1996)
 슈팅 (1996)
 연애의 기초 (1995)
 인연이란 (1995)
 Faraway Songba River (1993)
 500 Years of Joseon - The Memoirs of Lady Hyegyeong (1988-1989)
 Human Market (1988)

Theater 
 King Lear (1984)

Acting nominations 
 Nominated, 2005 4th Korean Film Awards: Best Supporting Actor (Marathon)
 Nominated, 2005 42nd Grand Bell Awards: Best Supporting Actor  (Marathon)

References

External links 
 Lee Ki-young Fan Cafe at Daum 
 
 
 

South Korean male television actors
South Korean male film actors
South Korean male stage actors
Seoul Institute of the Arts alumni
1963 births
Living people
People from Seoul